Notre-Dame-du-Hamel is a commune in the Eure department and Normandy region of northern France.

Population

See also
Communes of the Eure department

References

Communes of Eure